Pokémon The Park 2005 or  was a traveling Japanese theme park based on the Pokémon franchise. It previously existed in two locations, both currently closed. The theme parks featured many Pokémon-themed attractions, and were open between March 18, 2005, and September 25, 2005, in Japan.

In 2006, the park toured Taiwan, being showcased from June 23, 2006, to September 24, 2006 The site that housed this installment is now home to the Taipei Children's Amusement Park.

List of attractions 
The park featured many attractions themed after the franchise. A majority of the rides were sourced from a then-closed Japanese theme park in Izumisano, Osaka. The Taiwan version excluded many of the rides.

There were two Rocket Pokémon Shops located throughout the park. These shops had accessories for Pokémon fans and items such as Pokémon headgear, T-shirts, postcards, and official PokéPark souvenirs. It shut down because of limited assets. People in the park with a Nintendo DS were able to download a game via DS Download Play entitled PokéPark: Fishing Rally DS. A few people in the park with a Game Boy Advance were also gifted free Pokémon.

References

External links
 

2005 establishments in Japan
2005 disestablishments in Japan
2006 establishments in Taiwan
2006 disestablishments in Taiwan
Defunct amusement parks in Japan
Defunct amusement parks
Former buildings and structures in Taiwan
Pokémon